Kemmannu-Hoode-Bengre is a small village in the Udupi District of Karnataka State. It lies on the western coast of Karnataka, along the Suvarna River.

References

External links 
 Article in Kemmannu.com

Villages in Udupi district